Elizabeth Lynne Cheney (born July 28, 1966) is an American attorney and politician. She chaired the House Republican Conference, the third-highest position in the House Republican leadership, from 2019 to 2021. She currently serves as Professor of Practice at the University of Virginia Center for Politics.

Cheney is the elder daughter of former vice president Dick Cheney and second lady Lynne Cheney. She held several positions in the U.S. State Department during the George W. Bush administration, notably as Deputy Assistant Secretary of State for Near Eastern Affairs and Coordinator for Broader Middle East and North Africa Initiatives. She promoted regime change in Iran while chairing the Iran Syria Policy and Operations Group with Elliott Abrams. In 2009 Cheney and Bill Kristol founded Keep America Safe, a nonprofit organization concerned with national security issues, which advocated the Bush–Cheney administration's positions. She was a candidate for the 2014 election to the U.S. Senate in Wyoming, challenging three-term incumbent Mike Enzi, before withdrawing from the race. In the House of Representatives, she holds the seat her father held from 1979 to 1989.

Regarded as a leading ideological conservative in the Bush–Cheney-era tradition and a representative of the Republican establishment, Cheney is a neoconservative, known for her focus on national security, support for the U.S. military, a pro-business stance, hawkish foreign policy views, and fiscal and social conservatism. She is considered one of the leaders of the Republican Party's neoconservative wing, and was critical of the foreign policy of the Donald Trump administration but at the same time voted steadfastly in support of Trump's overall agenda.

Cheney supported the second impeachment of Donald Trump for his role in the 2021 storming of the U.S. Capitol. Because of her stance on the Capitol riot, her impeachment vote and opposition to Trump's false stolen-election narrative, pro-Trump Freedom Caucus members of the House Republican Conference attempted to remove her from party leadership in February 2021. That effort failed, and Cheney remained conference chair until mid-May, when pro-Trump members of the House again pushed for her removal. With House Minority Leader Kevin McCarthy supporting the effort, Cheney was removed from her position. In July 2021, Speaker Nancy Pelosi appointed Cheney to the House Select Committee on the January 6 Attack. Two months later, she was made vice chair of the committee. As a consequence of serving on the committee, Cheney's membership in the Wyoming Republican Party was revoked in November 2021.

On August 16, 2022, Cheney lost renomination in Wyoming's Republican primary to Trump-endorsed Harriet Hageman in a landslide, garnering just 28.9% of the vote. Her term expired on January 3, 2023. Cheney has said that she intends to be "the leader, one of the leaders, in a fight to help to restore our party", and that she may be interested in a presidential run.

Early life and education
Elizabeth Lynne Cheney was born on July 28, 1966, in Madison, Wisconsin, the elder of two daughters of former vice president Dick Cheney and former Second Lady Lynne Cheney (née Vincent). At the time of her birth, her parents were studying at the University of Wisconsin–Madison. Her younger sister, Mary Cheney, was also born in Madison. Cheney attended part of sixth and seventh grade in Casper, Wyoming, while her father campaigned for Congress. The family divided its time between Casper and Washington, D.C., in the 1970s through the 1980s, following her father's election to Congress. In 1984 Cheney graduated from McLean High School in suburban Washington, D.C., where she was a cheerleader. She received her Bachelor of Arts degree from Colorado College, her mother's alma mater, where she wrote her senior thesis, "The Evolution of Presidential War Powers". She received her Juris Doctor from the University of Chicago Law School in 1996. While there, she also took courses in Middle Eastern history at the Oriental Institute.

Early career
Before attending law school, Cheney worked for the State Department for five years and the United States Agency for International Development between 1989 and 1993. After 1993, she took a job at Armitage Associates LLP, the consulting firm founded by Richard Armitage, then a former Defense Department official and later the Deputy Secretary of State.

After graduation from law school, Cheney practiced law at the law firm of White & Case and as an international law attorney and consultant at the International Finance Corporation, a member of the World Bank Group. She was also Special Assistant to the Deputy Secretary of State for Assistance to the former Soviet Union, and a USAID officer in U.S. embassies in Budapest and Warsaw.

State Department

Deputy Assistant Secretary of State for Near Eastern Affairs
In 2002, Cheney was appointed Deputy Assistant Secretary of State for Near Eastern Affairs, a preexisting vacant post with an "economic portfolio", a mandate to promote investment in the region. Amid reports, including a New York Times op-ed piece by Paul Krugman, that the job was created especially for her, State Department spokesman Richard Boucher said that she had come recommended by then-Secretary of State Colin Powell. The Sunday Times reported that Cheney's appointment was "the most intriguing sign that America is getting serious about Middle East reform" and "a measure of the seriousness with which the administration was taking Middle East programmes for literacy, education, and reform". The appointment followed publicized policy divisions between the Vice President's office and the State Department on Middle East policy. In that position, she was given control of the Middle East Partnership Initiative, designed to "foster increased democracy and economic progress in a troubled region". The program spent $29 million in 2002, increased to $129 million in the following year. Cheney's task was to channel money to prescreened groups, some of which were not identified publicly for fear of retaliations from extant governments they sought to undermine. For the budget year 2004, the project sought $145 million.

2004 Bush–Cheney reelection campaign

After two years, Cheney left her State Department post in 2003 to work for the Bush–Cheney 2004 reelection campaign. She participated in the campaign's "W Stands for Women" initiative to target female voters.

Principal Deputy Assistant Secretary of State for Near Eastern Affairs
On February 14, 2005, she returned to the U.S. State Department and was appointed Principal Deputy Assistant Secretary of State For Near Eastern Affairs and Coordinator for Broader Middle East and North Africa Initiatives. In this position, Cheney supported the Assistant Secretary of State for Near Eastern Affairs, C. David Welch, and coordinated multilateral efforts to promote and support democracy and expand education and economic opportunities in the Middle East and North Africa. Cheney oversaw the launch of two semi-independent foundations, the Fund of the Future (worth $100 million), to provide capital for small businesses, and the Foundation of the Future (worth $55 million), to promote freedom of the press and democracy. In that capacity, Cheney endorsed a draft of a new Iraqi constitution.

Iran Syria Policy and Operations Group
Cheney also headed the Iran Syria Policy and Operations Group (ISOG), established in March 2006, a unit within the State Department's Bureau of Near Eastern Affairs.

In April 2006, The New York Times published a story that was critical of Cheney's work, particularly with respect to Iran. The International Republican Institute, a grants program administered by Cheney's unit in collaboration with a Republican-affiliated foundation, received particular scrutiny. Shortly before the ISOG group was dissolved, Secretary of State Condoleezza Rice initiated a major effort to engage Iran and Syria in efforts to stabilize Iraq.

Post–State Department career
In June 2007 Cheney signed on as one of three national co-chairs of Fred Thompson's 2008 presidential campaign. The others were Spencer Abraham and George Allen. In a press release issued at the beginning of his campaign, Thompson said he was "very pleased to announce that former Senators Abraham and Allen, as well as Liz Cheney, will serve as co-chairs of my national leadership team". He added: "These distinguished individuals bring wise counsel and invaluable experience to my campaign leadership team, and they will play a critical role in helping spread my consistent conservative message across America." After Thompson dropped out of the race, Cheney joined Mitt Romney's presidential campaign as a senior foreign policy advisor.

In October 2009, Liz Cheney, William Kristol, and Deborah Burlingame launched, as board members, the nonprofit 501(c)(4) organization Keep America Safe. The group's stated purpose is to "provide information for concerned Americans about critical national security issues". It drew strong criticism from conservative lawyers, many of whom had worked for the Bush administration, after its campaign against "The Al Qaeda 7", seven Justice Department lawyers in the Obama administration who previously had worked as defense lawyers for Guantanamo detainees. Shortly after, all information about the organization disappeared from the Internet.

In January 2012, Cheney was hired as a contributor for Fox News. She guest-hosted programs such as Hannity and Fox News Sunday. The network terminated her contract in July 2013 after she started her 2014 bid for the Senate in Wyoming.

2014 U.S. Senate bid

On July 16, 2013, Cheney launched a run for the Senate in 2014 from Wyoming as a Republican, challenging incumbent Republican senator Mike Enzi. The National Republican Senatorial Committee said it would back Enzi, as was policy. Cheney was expected to receive strong fundraising, but was subject to public perceptions of carpetbagging, having lived in Wyoming only a few years as a child before purchasing a home there in 2012. When she launched her 2014 Senate campaign, she did it with a Facebook post geotagged to McLean, Virginia, her primary residence at the time. During that campaign, The New Republic columnist Jon Ward wrote, "she talked up her Wyoming roots and dressed in boots. But when I chatted with her at one stop, her jeans were so new that her hands were stained blue from touching them." In the video she noted that the Cheney family first came to Wyoming in 1852. Her father represented Wyoming in the House from 1979 to 1989.

In her first campaign appearance in Cheyenne, Cheney said, "We have to not be afraid of being called obstructionists. Obstructing President Obama's policies and his agenda isn't actually obstruction; it's patriotism." Cheney claimed that Obama had "literally declared war" on the First and Second amendments to the United States Constitution as well as the interests of Wyoming ranchers and energy workers who faced regulations from the United States Environmental Protection Agency.

Cheney's campaign was marred by criticism from her championing of "hawkish" foreign policy positions to a public spat with her sister over her opposition to same-sex marriage. Enzi's continuing popularity made it difficult for Cheney to make inroads with Wyoming Republicans. On January 6, 2014, Cheney withdrew from the race, citing family health issues.

U.S. House of Representatives

Elections

2016

After Wyoming congresswoman Cynthia Lummis retired in the fall of 2015, Cheney launched a campaign for her House seat on February 1, 2016. She was widely considered the front-runner, and a poll commissioned by the Casper Star-Tribune and Wyoming PBS showed her leading in the Republican primarythe real contest in this heavily Republican state. Russian-American oil tycoon Simon Kukes contributed to her campaign. She was elected with over 60% of the vote.

2018

In the November 6 general election, Cheney was reelected to the House with 127,951 votes, defeating Democrat Greg Hunter (59,898 votes), Libertarian Richard Brubaker (6,918) and Constitution Party candidate Daniel Clyde Cummings (6,069). Cheney won 21 of 23 counties, losing Albany and Teton Counties to Hunter. On November 14, the Republican membership elected Cheney chair of the House Republican Conference for the 116th Congress. In this post, she was the third-ranking Republican in the chamber, behind Minority Leader Kevin McCarthy and Minority Whip Steve Scalise.

2020

Cheney defeated Blake Stanley in the Republican primary with 73% of the vote, and Democrat Lynnette Grey Bull in the general election with 69% of the vote.

2022

Cheney lost the August 16, 2022, Republican primary to pro-Trump candidate Harriet Hageman, with 28.9% of the vote to Hageman's 66.3%. Her margin of defeat was the second-worst for a House incumbent in the last 60 years, behind that of South Carolina Republican Bob Inglis in a 2010 primary runoff.

Tenure
Cheney was sworn into office on January 3, 2017. Donald Trump became president that same month, and an analysis by FiveThirtyEight found Cheney supported Trump's position in 92.9% of House votes.

She co-sponsored legislation that would end protection for grey wolves in the Endangered Species Act.

In May 2019, Cheney said that Peter Strzok and another FBI agent who sent personal text messages in which they disparaged various politicians (including Trump) sounded as if they were planning a "coup" and may be guilty of "treason".

In June 2019, Alexandria Ocasio-Cortez compared the holding centers for illegal immigrants at the Mexico–United States border to "concentration camps". Cheney criticized her words, saying they showed "disrespect" for Holocaust victims.

Speaking as chairwoman at a House Republican Conference in August 2019, Cheney said that the successful litigation (Crow Tribe et al v. Zinke) by Native tribes and environmentalists to return the grizzly bear in Greater Yellowstone to the Endangered Species Act "was not based on science or facts" but motivated by plaintiffs' "intent on destroying our Western way of life". Her statements drew comments from indigenous tribal nations and environmentalists. Tribal nations hold the grizzly sacred, and environmentalists have voiced concerns about trophy hunts, livestock and logging interests, and the gas, coal, and oil extraction industries.

Cheney condemned the Turkish invasion of the Kurdish areas in Syria, which was made possible by Trump's decision to withdraw U.S. military forces that served as a buffer between Turkey and the Kurdish areas in Syria, saying, "The U.S. is abandoning our ally the Kurds, who fought ISIS on the ground and helped protect the U.S. homeland. This decision aids America’s adversaries, Russia, Iran, and Turkey, and paves the way for a resurgence of ISIS." Cheney partly blamed the Democratic Party and the impeachment inquiry into Trump for Turkey's actions, saying, "It was not an accident that the Turks chose this moment to roll across the border." A spokesperson for House Speaker Nancy Pelosi called Cheney's claim about the impact of U.S. presidential impeachment proceedings on the invasion "delusional".

At a House Republican Conference in July 2020, some Republicans, including Jim Jordan of Ohio and Andy Biggs of Arizona, criticized Cheney for defending Dr. Fauci amid the COVID-19 pandemic, and for previously endorsing Kentucky Congressman Thomas Massie's primary opponent.

In September 2020, Cheney asked the Justice Department to investigate environmental groups such as the NRDC, Sea Change, and the Sierra Club, saying that "robust political and judicial activismcombined with the fact that these groups often espouse views that align with those of our adversariesmakes it all the more critical that the Department is aware of any potential foreign influence within or targeting these groups. I urge the Department to investigate Chinese and Russian attempts to influence environmental and energy policy in the United States".

Beginning during his time as a Dublin, California city councilman, Eric Swalwell was targeted by a Chinese woman believed to be an undercover officer of China's Ministry of State Security. Swalwell's general relationship with a suspected Chinese agent has been characterized as problematic, particularly given his high-profile role as a member of the House Intelligence Committee. Cheney signed a letter demanding Swalwell's removal from the House Intelligence Committee. She also said, "the extent to which [the Chinese Communist Party] caused [COVID-19] to be spread around the world has really shone a spotlight on the nature of that regime, and has really focused the attention of not just people in the United States but our allies around the world on the threat that they pose and how important it is we protect ourselves by moving supply chains, by ending our dependence on the Chinese government".

During the COVID-19 pandemic in the United States, Cheney voted against the American Rescue Plan Act of 2021 and the COVID-19 Hate Crimes Act but for the PPP Extension Act.

Voting record
From 2017 to 2021, Cheney voted in line with Trump's position around 93% of the time, supporting him more consistently in House votes than many House Republican members, even his former chief of staff Mark Meadows. In 2019, according to the New York Times, Cheney publicly feuded with Rand Paul over who was "Trumpier". According to The Atlantic, she was a "loyal Trumpist" and helped build "the party of Trump" at that time.

Second impeachment of Donald Trump

On January 12, 2021, following the 2021 United States Capitol attack during the certification process for President-elect Joe Biden, Cheney said she would vote to impeach Trump for his role in inciting the attack. At a rally just before the attack, Trump told the mob of insurrectionists to "get rid of" Cheney, and the mob then attacked the Capitol while chanting "Hang Mike Pence!" and trying to find lawmakers. Cheney said that Trump "lit the flame" of the riot and did nothing to stop it. Saying, "there has never been a greater betrayal by a President of the United States of his office and his oath", she supported impeachment. Nine other Republicans joined her in doing so on January 13. She was then the third-ranking Republican in the House. Jim Jordan (one of 139 House members, and 8 senators, who voted for — or supported — the objections to the Electoral College count) called for her removal from Republican Party leadership. Andy Biggs took offense specifically with the wording of Cheney's remark, saying: "She puts out a statement saying that what this president did is maybe one of the most heinous things in the history of the US presidency. Her words were used over and over again when the Democrats were making their speeches on the floor of the House. And they will be used again when the Senate opens up another bogus trial in the Senate. That is what the problem is."

Former President George W. Bush's spokesman said on January 30 that Bush supported Cheney's actions and intended to call his former vice president, Dick Cheney, to "thank him for his daughter's service". Days later, Senate minority leader Mitch McConnell said, "Liz Cheney is a leader with deep convictions and the courage to act on them. She is an important leader in our party and in our nation. I am grateful for her service and look forward to continuing to work with her on the crucial issues facing our nation". McConnell also condemned Trump supporters' "loony lies". Senator Lindsey Graham said Cheney "is one of the strongest and most reliable conservative voices in the Republican Party. She is a fiscal and social conservative, and no one works harder to ensure that our military is well prepared".

Trump supporters were angered by Cheney's vote to impeach. On February 3, 2021, the House Republican Conference held a closed-door, secret-ballot vote on whether to remove her from her position in the Republican House leadership. She held her position by a 145–61 vote, with one member voting present. After the vote, Cheney said, "we're not going to be divided and that we're not going to be in a situation where people can pick off any member of leadership". On February 6, the Wyoming Republican Party censured Cheney for her vote to impeach Trump. Cheney responded, "My vote to impeach was compelled by the oath I swore to the Constitution. Wyoming citizens know that this oath does not bend or yield to politics or partisanship. I will always fight for Wyoming values and stand up for our Western way of life." She rejected the Wyoming party's demands that she step down and noted the censure incorrectly asserted that the Capitol attack was instigated by Antifa and Black Lives Matter.

Cheney raised the possibility of a criminal investigation of Trump for provoking violence  and said he "does not have a role as a leader of our party going forward". In April 2021, she said she would not vote for him if he were the Republican nominee for president in 2024. In May 2021, she said: "I will do everything I can to ensure that [Trump] never again gets anywhere near the Oval Office" and "we cannot let the former president drag us backward and make us complicit in his efforts to unravel our democracy."

In his first speech since the Capitol attack, Trump attacked the Bush administration for launching the Afghanistan and Iraq wars, and described Liz Cheney as a "warmonger" and "a person that loves seeing our troops fighting" for her support for the Bush administration's foreign policy.

In March 2021 former Republican speaker Paul Ryan stated his support for Cheney. Salon wrote that although Cheney is "arch-conservative", she is "now considered too liberal for some GOP extremists". Maryland Governor Larry Hogan said "Liz Cheney is a solid conservative Republican" who "just stood up and told the truth" in May 2021.

Removal as conference chair
In response to rising calls from House Republicans for her to be removed from her position as House Republican Conference chair after her ongoing criticism of Trump, Cheney wrote an opinion article, "The GOP is at a turning point. History is watching us", published in The Washington Post on May 5, 2021. In it, she reiterated her positions on adhering to the principles of the U.S. Constitution, upholding the law, and defending "the basic principles that underpin and protect our freedom and our democratic process". Senator Joni Ernst criticized the GOP's efforts to remove Cheney from party leadership, comparing it to cancel culture.

On the eve of a House Republican vote to remove her, Cheney made an address on the House floor after her colleagues had left the chamber, saying in part:

Today we face a threat America has never seen before. A former president, who provoked a violent attack on this Capitol in an effort to steal the election, has resumed his aggressive effort to convince Americans that the election was stolen from him. He risks inciting further violence. Millions of Americans have been misled by the former president. They have heard only his words, but not the truth, as he continues to undermine our democratic process, sowing seeds of doubt about whether democracy really works at all. I am a conservative Republican and the most conservative of conservative principles is reverence for the rule of law. The Electoral College has voted. More than sixty state and federal courts, including multiple judges he appointed, have rejected the former president's claims. The Department of Justice in his administration investigated the former president's claims of widespread fraud and found no evidence to support them. The election is over. That is the rule of law. That is our constitutional process. Those who refuse to accept the rulings of our courts are at war with the Constitution.

Cheney was formally removed by voice vote at a closed-door House Republican Conference meeting on May 12, 2021, and was replaced by Elise Stefanik. Five GOP representatives requested a recorded vote, but McCarthy chose to decide the matter by voice vote. As it was a voice vote conducted behind closed doors, it was unclear which lawmakers supported her ouster.

After her battles with Republican leadership, Cheney spent $58,000 on a private security detail.

End of recognition by Wyoming Republican Party 
On November 13, 2021, the Wyoming GOP Central Committee voted 31–29 to no longer recognize Cheney as a member of the party. The resolution reiterated the general complaint for which it had censured her the previous February, saying that Cheney had never provided "quantifiable and or undisputed evidence" for why she had voted in favor of impeachment. There had been similar votes by two Wyoming counties three months earlier to remove her from the party.

Censure by Republican National Committee
On February 4, 2022, the Republican National Committee called the events of January 6, 2021, "legitimate political discourse" and overwhelmingly voted to censure Cheney and Representative Adam Kinzinger by voice vote for taking part in the House investigation of the Capitol assault.

Committee assignments
 Committee on Armed Services
 Subcommittee on Intelligence and Special Operations
 Subcommittee on Strategic Forces
 United States House Select Committee on the January 6 Attack (Vice Chair)

Caucus memberships 
 Congressional Western Caucus

Possible presidential run
In May 2021, Cheney said that she intends to be "the leader, one of the leaders, in a fight to help to restore our party". In an interview on ABC News's This Week, she refused to rule out a presidential bid; this prompted media speculation about her interest in a presidential run in 2024.

In June 2021, Cheney joined the board of the Gerald R. Ford Foundation.

Just after her primary election defeat on August 16, 2022, Cheney filed paperwork with the Federal Election Commission creating a leadership political action committee (PAC) named "The Great Task". The PAC's name comes from The Gettysburg Address: Lincoln spoke of the "great task remaining before us". Pressed by reporters after her primary loss, Cheney said she was "thinking about" a presidential run. On September 24, at the Texas Tribune Festival, she said she would "make sure" Trump does not win the Republican presidential nomination, adding: "if he is the nominee, I won’t be a Republican."

Political positions

Cheney has described herself as a conservative Republican. Lawrence R. Jacobs has said, "Cheney is an arch-conservative. She's a hard-edged, small government, lower taxes figure and a leading voice on national defense." Jake Bernstein argued that "Liz Cheney is a true conservative in every sense of the word and she’s only a moderate in relation to the radicalism that has seized the Republican party." Politico called her the "face of the anti-Trump GOP and a relic of the Republican Party before the dominance of Trump."

Cheney has several times been described as "Republican royalty". The National Interest called her the "heiress to a neoconservative throne". Salon called her "arch-conservative". The Brookings Institution argued that Cheney has a long-term strategy to become the leader of the Republican Party in the post-Trump era, and that "she’s a real conservative—Democrats who like her opposition to Trump will never like her politics."

2022 midterm support

During the 2022 midterm elections, Cheney said she would campaign against candidates who denied or questioned the results of the 2020 presidential election. Her political action committee, The Great Task, ran TV ads imploring Republican voters in Arizona to vote against Kari Lake and Mark Finchem, the Republican nominees for governor and secretary of state. In October 2022, she endorsed Democratic Congresswoman Elissa Slotkin for reelection over Republican nominee Tom Barrett, a Michigan state senator who questioned the results of the 2020 election. According to Cheney, her endorsement of Slotkin was her first ever of a Democrat. Cheney also expressed support for Ohio Democrat Tim Ryan in his U.S. Senate campaign against Republican J. D. Vance; Vance has supported false claims of widespread voter fraud in the 2020 election. Cheney also endorsed Democratic Congresswomen Abigail Spanberger over her Republican opponent, Yesli Vega, who Cheney said promoted "conspiracy theories".

Drug legislation
Cheney has supported bills to further restrict opioids in the face of the opioid epidemic. She voted against the Marijuana Opportunity Reinvestment and Expungement (MORE) Act of 2019/2020 (H.R. 3884), which, among other things, would have removed cannabis from the list of scheduled substances regulated by the Controlled Substances Act and establish a process to expunge criminal convictions for cannabis.

Foreign policy 
Cheney is a neoconservative who rejects America First foreign policy. She opposed proposals to withdraw from Afghanistan. Cheney has criticized what she has called the "Putin wing" of the Republican Party.

When working in the United States Department of State as Deputy Assistant Secretary of State for Near Eastern Affairs, Cheney supported the Iraq War, as promoted by her father, Dick Cheney.

According to Mother Jones, Cheney insists "that one of the main lies of the Bush-Cheney fraudulent case for war—that there had been a significant connection between al-Qaeda and Iraq—was true." New York Times columnist Maureen Dowd has commented that Cheney used "her patronage perch in the State Department during the Bush-Cheney years ... [and] bolstered her father's trumped-up case for an invasion of Iraq" while cheering "on her dad as he spread fear, propaganda and warped intelligence".

Cheney is a strong supporter of Israel and has expressed support for Israeli plans to annex parts of the occupied West Bank. She signed a letter to Israeli Prime Minister Benjamin Netanyahu that reaffirms "the unshakeable alliance between the United States and Israel".

On June 17, 2021, Cheney was one of 160 House Republicans to vote against repealing the 2002 AUMF, which granted the Bush administration the authority to wage war with Iraq. She said that repealing the resolution "would send a message of weakness to our adversaries and allies alike".

In 2015, Cheney and her father expressed opposition to the Joint Comprehensive Plan of Action, saying that it would "lead to a nuclear-armed Iran". On June 21, 2019, after Trump called off military strikes against Iran for allegedly downing an American drone, Cheney compared Trump not attacking Iran to Barack Obama not attacking Syria in 2013. On September 18, 2019, she called for the United States to consider a "proportional military response" against Iran after it was attacking oil bases in the Saudi regions of Abqaiq and Khurais.

Military 
Cheney opposes the no-first-use nuclear policy. After the second round of the 2020 Democratic Party presidential debates, Cheney criticized Elizabeth Warren when she advocated the policy. Cheney voted to include provisions to draft women in the National Defense Authorization Act of 2022.

Cheney has supported the use of torture. In 2009, she defended the use of waterboarding during the George W. Bush administration, comparing it to SERE training. In 2014, she criticized President Barack Obama after he said, "we tortured some folks". Also that year, she criticized Nancy Pelosi for calling out her father for his support of using torture.

In 2018, when U.S. Senator John McCain criticized CIA nominee Gina Haspel, Cheney again defended the use of so-called enhanced interrogation techniques, saying that they "saved lives, prevented attacks, and produced intel that led to Osama bin Laden". Cheney's remarks were criticized by Meghan McCain, who responded that her father—who was tortured as a prisoner of war during the Vietnam War—"doesn't need torture explained to him".

On September 26, 2021, during an interview with Lesley Stahl on 60 Minutes, Cheney reaffirmed her support for waterboarding, saying that it is not torture.

January 6 commission 
Cheney was one of 35 Republicans who joined all Democrats in voting to approve legislation to establish the January 6 commission meant to investigate the storming of the U.S. Capitol. Before the vote, she was one of few Republican lawmakers who openly expressed support for the commission.

On October 21, 2021, Cheney was one of nine House Republicans who voted to hold Steve Bannon in contempt of Congress.

Same-sex marriage
In 2013, during her Senate bid, Cheney voiced her opposition to same-sex marriage. This caused a public falling-out with her gay sister Mary Cheney, who wrote in a Facebook post, "Either [y]ou think all families should be treated equally or you don't. Liz's position is to treat my family as second class citizens." Mary declared she would not support Liz's 2014 Senate candidacy. The family spat becoming a focus of media attention was cited as one of the reasons Cheney ended her Senate campaign.

On September 26, 2021, during an interview with Lesley Stahl on 60 Minutes, Cheney expressed regret for not supporting same-sex marriage. She was one of 47 Republicans to vote for the Respect for Marriage Act of 2022, which would codify same-sex marriage into federal law, and passed the House, 267–157.

Contraception

In 2022, Cheney voted for H.R. 8373 ("The Right to Contraception Act"), a bill designed to protect access to contraceptives and health care providers' ability to provide contraceptives and information about contraception.

Conspiracy theories
Bud Goodall in 2016 called Cheney a "conspiracy propagandist".

In 2009, Cheney refused to denounce adherents of Barack Obama citizenship conspiracy theories (birtherism) on Larry King Live, saying that the birtherism movement existed because "people are uncomfortable with a president who is reluctant to defend the nation overseas". According to Mother Jones, the Obama citizenship conspiracy theory was an "odious lie that Liz Cheney also defended". In 2009, Cheney gave the keynote address at a dinner hosted by the Center for Security Policy, an anti-Muslim think tank deemed a hate group by the Southern Poverty Law Center and known for promoting the false claim that Obama is a Muslim.

Cheney has denounced the far-right conspiracy theory QAnon, saying, "QAnon is a dangerous lunacy that should have no place in American politics".

Awards and honors
Cheney was selected for the inaugural 2021 Forbes 50 Over 50, a list of notable entrepreneurs, leaders, scientists and creators over age 50. She was also included in the 2021 Time 100, Times annual list of the 100 most influential people in the world.

On April 22, 2022, the John F. Kennedy Library Foundation named Cheney a Profile in Courage Award recipient for "defending democracy". The foundation said that Cheney had been a "consistent and courageous voice in defense of democracy" and that she had "refused to take the politically expedient course that most of her party embraced." The award was presented in person on May 22.

Personal life 
Cheney is a United Methodist. She is married to Philip Perry, a partner at Latham & Watkins. They were married in Wyoming in 1993. They have five children. In 2012, Cheney moved to Wyoming.

Electoral history

Works

See also

 Women in the United States House of Representatives

Notes

References

External links

 2014 Campaign contributions at OpenSecrets
 
 Transcripts and videos
 Transcript: appearance on Fox News' No Spin Zone, interview with Bill O'Reilly, October 21, 2004
 Transcript: Foreign Press Center briefing on disbursement of MEPI funds, Manama, Bahrain, November 9, 2005
 Interview: Carnegie Endowment (August 25, 2008; HTML) (PDF)
 "Now The Real Work Begins", The Great Task - Cheney's channel at YouTube (16 August 2022)

|-

|-

|-

1966 births
20th-century American lawyers
20th-century American women lawyers
20th-century Methodists
21st-century American lawyers
21st-century American non-fiction writers
21st-century American politicians
21st-century American women lawyers
21st-century American women politicians
21st-century American women writers
21st-century Methodists
American political commentators
American United Methodists
Articles containing video clips
Liz
Children of vice presidents of the United States
Colorado College alumni
Criticism of Donald Trump
Female members of the United States House of Representatives
International Republican Institute
Lawyers from Madison, Wisconsin
Lawyers from Washington, D.C.
Living people
People from McLean, Virginia
Politicians from Madison, Wisconsin
Republican Party members of the United States House of Representatives from Wyoming
United States Department of State officials
University of Chicago Law School alumni
Women in Wyoming politics
Wyoming lawyers